Historia de un amor (English title:Story of a Love) is a Mexican telenovela produced by Televisa and transmitted by Telesistema Mexicano.

Cast 
Jorge Mistral
María Elena Marqués
Fernando Mendoza
Miguel Manzano
Luis Gimeno
Karina Duprez

References 

Mexican telenovelas
1971 telenovelas
Televisa telenovelas
Spanish-language telenovelas
1971 Mexican television series debuts
1971 Mexican television series endings